Krister Holmberg (born 17 May 1972) is a Finnish sports shooter who competed in the men's 10 metre running target event at the 1996 Summer Olympics.

References

1972 births
Living people
Finnish male sport shooters
Olympic shooters of Finland
Shooters at the 1996 Summer Olympics